The Annual Cyclopedia was an American yearbook covering the years 1861–1902 by the New York publisher D. Appleton & Company. It was a comprehensive yearbook of events, obituaries and statistics, worldwide, with many articles written by experts, some of them signed.

It was sold as an annual supplement to the New American Cyclopedia in 16 volumes, edited by George Ripley and Charles Anderson Dana, 1857–1863. When that encyclopedia was enlarged as American Cyclopedia (1873–1876), the Cyclopedia started a new series.

Sets are held in major libraries, and some volumes are online.

It appeared under several titles:
 The American annual cyclopedia and register of important events. Embracing political, civil, military, and social affairs: public documents; biography, statistics, commerce, finance, literature, science, agriculture, and mechanical industry. (1862–75)
 Appletons' annual cyclopedia and register of important events embracing political military, and ecclesiastical affairs; public documents; biography, statistics, commerce, finance, literature, science, agriculture, and mechanical industry : a general and analytical index to the American cyclopaedia.
 The Annual Cyclopedia
 Appleton's Annual Cyclopedia
 Appleton's American Annual Cyclopedia
 American annual cyclopedia and register of important events (1876-1903)
 American Annual Cyclopedia

Appleton also published a six volume biographical compendium, many of whose articles are linked in Wikipedia:
James Grant Wilson, and John Fiske, eds. Appletons' Cyclopædia of American Biography (D. Appleton and company, 1887) online vol 2

The editors included fake biographies to spot copyright violators, but no such accusation was made against the Annual Cyclopedia.

On line copies

Notes

External links
 Appletons' annual cyclopaedia and register of important events via HathiTrust, 1861-1902

Annual publications
Publications established in 1862
Publications disestablished in 1903
D. Appleton & Company books